Saint-Julien-de-l'Escap is a commune in the Charente-Maritime department in southwestern France.

Geography
The commune is traversed by the river Boutonne.

Population

See also
Communes of the Charente-Maritime department

References

Communes of Charente-Maritime
Charente-Maritime communes articles needing translation from French Wikipedia